Tarsa may refer to:
Tarsus (city), ancient city in Cilicia
Tarsa, India, village in Mouda tahasil of Nagpur district of Maharashtra, India
Târsa (disambiguation), places in Romania